Joey Paras is a Filipino theater, movie and television actor, director, filmmaker, singer, writer, playwright, film producer and TV host. He is  the playwright behind "Bawal Tumawid, Nakakamatay", one of the plays selected to be produced on stage in the seventh edition of Virgin Labfest (VLF). His rise to fame started in the movie scene when he played the lead role in the film Last Supper Number 3 which received the MTRCB Awards Best Comedy Film for 2010  and Cinemalaya 2009 Best Film. In 2013, he starred in his launching movie and title role Bekikang: Ang Nanay Kong Beki opposite Tom Rodriguez.

Early life
He graduated A.B.Communication Arts in the University of Santo Tomas. Before becoming an actor, he used to be an Overseas Filipino Worker (OFW) as a HOTEL LOUNGE SINGER in a lounge group named CICADA where they used to perform in Grand Hyatt Seoul, South Korea and Grand Hyatt Beijing, China. He worked abroad for several years until they disbanded.

He founded the group Teatro Expedicion de Filipinas which is an organization of young children from underprivileged communities in the country who have talent in acting. He later on founded in October 2013, THE POWERHOUSE ENSEMBLE, which is a group of aspiring actors who undergo free training in Theater and Film Production. The Powerhouse Ensemble produced several stage plays and short films. After holding series of audition and weeks of training, the group held its first theater production on December 28, 2013, entitled “Payback: Playback” wherein eight short plays (“Guho”, “Sapatos”, “Calorie” ,” 5-6-7-8”, “Haunted House”, “Meme”, and “Beauconera”) written and directed by Joey Paras were shown.

After the success of its first production, the group conducted several theater plays in the following months such as “Payback:Playback (The Repeat)” in January 2014, “Pepe Playback: The Musical” in February 2014, “Goodbye Series” in March 2014 and “Boy Bangs: The Musical” on March 16, 2014, as the group's entry to the Pasinaya Festival 2014.

After more than two years since it was established, The Powerhouse Ensemble opened its second season for the next batch of aspiring actors on October 10, 2015.

The Powerhouse Ensemble: Season 2 had its first show called “Eat, Pray, Watch” on October 30, 2015, wherein the past horror films made by Teatro Expedicion de Filipinas’ E-WORKSHOP Recital Films were screened.

Eventually, the second season did its first theater production on December 20, 2015, wherein eight short plays (“I’m Sorry, I’m Late”, “Excuse Me”, “Condolence”, “Byahera”, “Ruben Hud”, “Korean Bag”, “Katleya” and “Truth or Farce”) written and directed by Joey Paras were performed. The production was called “CaptivEight”.

The Powerhouse Ensemble: Season 2 then did a repeat show of “Captiveight” on January 25, 2016. This was followed by the play “Bahamas” that was performed by the group in CCP Pasinaya Festival 2016.

In January 2020, the group shot the short film "ANG KAIBIGAN NI IMAGINARY F." and won an award and made it to the international film festivals. This short film also made it to the final selection of SINAG MAYNILA 2020 (SHORT FILM CATEGORY).

In February 2020, The Powerhouse Ensemble produced and filmed the short film, "IGIB" (FETCH), Written and Directed by Joey Paras. This short film also made it to the international film festivals abroad and gave Joey Paras his very first INTERNATIONAL "BEST DIRECTOR AWARD" `Lazar Gjorgjevikј`in FILMAY INTERNATIONAL SHORT FILM FESTIVAL KUMANOVO 2020.

Television career
His first TV appearance was in ABS-CBN's Primetime soap Maging Sino Ka Man and in 2009 he transferred to GMA Network for the TV soap Ikaw Sana. Later he returned to ABS-CBN for Dahil May Isang Ikaw but in 2010, he joins the cast of GMA Network's The Last Prince. Since then, he appeared in GMA Network TV series and recently having a weekly show Sunday PinaSaya with Ai-Ai de las Alas and Marian Rivera.

Filmography

Television
Mulawin vs Ravena (2017) as Dakdak
Princess in the Palace (2015)
Vampire Ang Daddy Ko (2015) 
Sunday PinaSaya (2015–2019) as himself/mainstay
FlordeLiza (2015) as Rona
Sabado Badoo (2015) as himself cameo footage featured
Jim Fernandez's Galema, Anak ni Zuma (2013-2014) as Teacher Karlo
Wansapanataym
Petrang Paminta (2013) as Lana
Kahit Puso'y Masugatan (2012) as Bryan
Hindi Ka Na Mag-iisa (2012) as Mimi
Daldalita(2011) as Chichi
Sinner or Saint (2011) as Gerdo "Gigi" Manalo
I Heart You, Pare! (2011) as Serbeza
Maalaala Mo Kaya
Internet Shop (2011) as Bading
Bola (2009) as Budi
The Last Prince (2010) as Salim
Destined Hearts (2009)
Dahil May Isang Ikaw (2009) as Manolo Meloto
Ikaw Sana (2009) as Afi
Obra
Rowena Joy (2009)
Maging Sino Ka Man (2006) as Sionny

Films

Theater
Zsazsa Zaturnah Ze Muzikal
Ang Ulo ni Pancho Villa
ILUSTRADO: Ang Buhay ni Rizal
Noli Me Tangere
El Filibusterismo
Ulilang Tahanan
Prinsipe ng Buwan
Ang Bayot, Ang Meranao at ang Habal-Habal sa isang Nakakabagot na Paghihintay sa Kanto ng Lanao del Norte
Electle Dysfunction
Ang Saranggola ni Pepe
The Little Prince
Virgin Labfest
Bawal Tumawid, Nakamamatay

Writing and Directorial
SHORT FILMS:

1. I G I B (FETCH)

FESTIVALS:
OFFICIAL SELECTION
10th PUNE SHORT FILM FESTIVAL 2020

OFFICIAL SELECTION
THE LIFT OFF SESSIONS 2020

OFFICIAL SELECTION
COSMO FILM FESTIVAL 2020

OFFICIAL SELECTION
(EXHIBITION CATEGORY)
CINEMALAYA SHORT FILM FESTIVAL 2020

OFFICIAL SELECTION
(COMPETITION FILMS)
PELIKULTURA: THE CALABARZON FILM FESTIVAL 2020 
-Southern Tagalog Shorts Premiere-

AWARDS:

BEST DIRECTOR AWARD
('Lazar Gjorgjevikј')
FILMAY INTERNATIONAL SHORT FILM FESTIVAL KUMANOVO 2020

BEST ACTRESS AWARD
COSMO FILM FESTIVAL 2020

2. ANG KAIBIGAN NI IMAGINARY F. (English Title: THE FRIEND OF IMAGINARY F.)

FESTIVALS:

OFFICIAL SELECTION
NOIDA INTERNATIONAL FILM FESTIVAL 2020

OFFICIAL SELECTION
THE BEBOP CHANNEL CONTENT FESTIVAL 2020

OFFICIAL SELECTION
MY LOVE MICHELLE SHORT FILM FESTIVAL 2020

OFFICIAL SELECTION
SINAG MAYNILA INDEPENDENT FILM FESTIVAL 2020

AWARDS:

BEST ACTOR AWARD 
NOIDA INTERNATIONAL FILM FESTIVAL 2020

SPECIAL MENTION
UK SEASONAL SHORT FILM FESTIVAL

FULL-LENGTH FILMS:

1. HAWA (MALADY)

FESTIVALS:
OFFICIAL SELECTION
MONSTERS OF HORROR FESTIVAL 2020 in TULSA, U.S.A.

SEMI-FINALIST
CINEMA LAB V2.0
Zapatoca Santander, Colombia

2. HANTU (GHOST)

FESTIVALS:

SEMI-FINALIST
CINEMA LAB V2.0
Zapatoca Santander, Colombia

3. WALA NA BANG IBANG TITLE? (IS THERE NO OTHER TITLE?)

FESTIVALS:

QC INTERNATIONAL PINK FESTIVAL 2014

List of JOEY PARAS Theater Plays (Written and Directed):

•	5,6,7,8
•	Talents
•	Gate Crash
•	Apartment
•	Hostage Drama
•	Bahay ni Maria
•	Mascot
•	Calorie 
•	Tono
•	Talk to the Hand 
•	Christmas Wish 
•	Sinehan
•	Meme
•	Double 
•	Ispiritista
•	Sapatos 
•	Nose Bleed
•	Hubadera
•	Beauconera
•	Sabado De Gloria
•	Guho 
•	Goodbye Baby
•	Goodbye Bhe
•	Goodbye Honey
•	Goodbye Mahal 
•	Pinky 
•	Talents Part 2
•	Mama Mary
•	Bawal Tumawid, Nakamamatay
•	Ang Haunted House House sa Ilalim ng Papaya Tree
•	Boy Bangs (The Musical)
•	How Many Steps Pataas? 
•	Sintunado 
•	Goodbye Sweetie
•	Happy Is A Sad Name 
•	Im Sorry, Im Late
•	Querida
•	Bahamas 
•	Excuse Me
•	Condolence 
•	Byahera
•	Korean Bag
•	Ruben Hud 
•	Katleya
•	Truth or Farce?
•	Tayo
•	Hi! It's Me
•	Boo-Boo
•	I Am Jacqueline Jinnicle 
•	Inayawan
•	Ang Singsing That Will Make You Sing
•	Mary Jane
•	Ang Taya
•	Si Pak Girl at ang Lihim ng Dambuhalang Buraot
•	Badante
•	Disorderr (The Musical)
•	Danse Macabre
•	Wait Behind the Yellow Line
•	Hype Bees
•	Go Cloud 999
•	Bakuna
•	Offer Good While Supplies Last
•	Tiwarik
•	Marissa
•	Mema
•	Mukbang
•	Besame
•	Mine Heart Heart
•	Stay In
•	Hindi Tunay Na Pangalan
•	Ang Tatlong Bruha
•	Isa Akong Disney Princess
•	Kintsugi
•	Ang Kaibigan ni Imaginary F.
•	Ka-Close Mo Jusko Sobra (KMJS)

Joey Paras` List of  Short Feature Films (Written and Directed):

1. Hantu
2. Kusot
3. Tiwang
4. Simsimi
5. Pasaload
6. Torpe si Kid
7. Ang Tawag Dito Ay iPad
8. Capsule Ex
9. Facunda
10. Wanted Houseboy
11. Poetic Silence
12. Beks and the CD
13. Hinango
14. Save the Bed for Lass
15. The Jeepney Musical
16. Wala Na Bang Ibang Title?
17. Alone and Lonely 
18. Decode Red
19. Aga
20. Hawa
21. Dud
22. Hagod
23. Papang
24. Sorry, May Nanalo Na

Awards
ACTING AWARDS
Cinemalaya Independent Film Festival 2013 - Best Supporting Actor for New Breed Category (for the film Babagwa)
Gawad Urian Awards Pinakamahusay na aktor 2010 (Nominated for the film Last Supper 3)
Golden Screen Awards Best Performance by an Actor in a Leading Role 2010 (Nominated for Last Supper No. 3)
Star Awards New Movie Actor of the Year 2010 (Nominated for Last Supper No. 3)
Aliw Awards 2008 Best Actor (for the play Ang Bayot, Ang Meranao at ang Habal-Habal sa isang nakakabagot na paghihintay sa kanto ng Lanao del Norte)
PHILSTAGE Gawad Buhay Award Best Male Actor (for the play Ang Bayot, Ang Meranao at ang Habal-Habal sa isang nakakabagot na paghihintay sa kanto ng Lanao del Norte)

DIRECTORIAL AWARD
"BEST DIRECTOR AWARD" `Lazar Gjorgjevikј`in FILMAY INTERNATIONAL SHORT FILM FESTIVAL KUMANOVO 2020.

References

1988 births
Living people
21st-century Filipino male singers
21st-century Filipino male actors
Filipino male film actors
Filipino male television actors
GMA Network personalities
ABS-CBN personalities
Filipino gay actors
Filipino LGBT comedians
Filipino LGBT singers
Filipino male comedians
Gay singers
Gay comedians
University of Santo Tomas alumni
Filipino male stage actors
Filipino film directors
Filipino theatre directors
21st-century Filipino LGBT people